"Walk on Water" is a song by American rock singer Eddie Money from his album Nothing to Lose in 1988. Written by one-time Sammy Hagar keyboardist Jesse Harms (who also performed on the track), the tune was released as a single and reached number nine on the Billboard Hot 100 and number two on the Album Rock Tracks chart. It also features a guitar solo from Jimmy Lyon, who had previously been a member of Eddie Money's band.

Chart history

Weekly charts

Year-end charts

References

Eddie Money songs
1988 singles
1988 songs